is a Japanese footballer who plays for Roasso Kumamoto.

Club statistics
Updated to 23 February 2016.

References

External links

Profile at Roasso Kumamoto

1987 births
Living people
Japan University of Economics alumni
Association football people from Fukuoka Prefecture
Japanese footballers
J1 League players
J2 League players
Albirex Niigata players
Kataller Toyama players
Roasso Kumamoto players
Oita Trinita players
Association football goalkeepers